Aleksandr Yatsevich (born September 8, 1956) is a retired hurdler from the Soviet Union, best known for winning the silver medal in the men's 400m hurdles at the 1982 European Championships in Athens, Greece.

References
 1982 Year Ranking
 

1956 births
Living people
Russian male hurdlers
Soviet male hurdlers
Place of birth missing (living people)
European Athletics Championships medalists
World Athletics Championships athletes for the Soviet Union